Mr. Robinson was a short-lived American sitcom television series created by Owen Ellickson, and developed by Robb Cullen and Mark Cullen, which ran from August 5 through August 19, 2015, on NBC.

Premise
The series stars Craig Robinson as a high school music teacher and part-time musician.

Cast

Main
 Craig Robinson as Craig Robinson
 Ben Koldyke as Jimmy Hooper
 Brandon T. Jackson as Ben Robinson
 Spencer Grammer as Ashleigh Fellows
 Amandla Stenberg as Halle Foster
 Peri Gilpin as Principal Eileen Taylor

Recurring
 Meagan Good as Victoria Wavers
 Tim Bagley as Supervisor Dalton
 Asif Ali as Samir Panj
 Dante Brown as Deandre Hall
 Ethan Josh Lee as Quan Phook
 Franchesca Maia as Maria

Production

Development
The original pilot was created by Owen Ellickson and was in development at NBC for the 2013–14 United States network television season. It also starred Robinson, and included a cast of Jean Smart, Larenz Tate, Amandla Stenberg and Amanda Lund. Greg Daniels served as executive producer.

NBC placed a six-episode order for the series on January 6, 2014, with Mark Cullen and Robb Cullen as showrunners, replacing Owen Ellickson, and several characters recast. The series debuted in August 2015.

Cancellation
On September 14, 2015, the series was cancelled after one season and six episodes.

Episodes

Reception
Mr. Robinson has received generally negative reviews from critics. On Rotten Tomatoes the series has a rating of 19%, based on 26 reviews, with an average rating of 3.2/10. The site's critical consensus reads, "Mr. Robinson is held back by too many sitcom tropes, bad plots, and stock characters, wasting its appealing star." On Metacritic, the series has a score of 41 out of 100, based on 20 critics, indicating "mixed or average reviews".

Dominic Patten of Deadline said that the show is not funny. Bruce R. Miller of the Sioux City Journal said, "Mr. Robinson just does not work". Jeff Jensen of Entertainment Weekly gave the show a grade of C−.

References

External links
 
 

2010s American black sitcoms
2010s American high school television series
2010s American workplace comedy television series
2015 American television series debuts
2015 American television series endings
English-language television shows
NBC original programming
Television series by 3 Arts Entertainment
Television series by Universal Television
Television shows set in Chicago
Television series about educators